The 1958 Coppa Italia was the 11th Coppa Italia, the major Italian domestic cup. The competition was won by Lazio.

Group stage

Group 1

Group 2

Group 3

Group 4

Group 5

Group 6

Group 7

Group 8

Quarter-finals

Semi-finals

Semi-final 5-8 place matches

Third place match 

p=after penalty shoot-out

Final

Final 5-6 place match 
Date: 4 Nov 1958

Final 7-8 place match 
Date: 4 Nov 1958

p=after penalty shoot-out

Top goalscorers

External links
rsssf.com

Coppa Italia seasons
1957–58 domestic association football cups
Coppa